Lee Anna Clark is an American psychologist and William J. and Dorothy K. O’Neill Professor of Psychology in the Department of Psychology at the University of Notre Dame in Notre Dame, Indiana, United States. She used to be a professor and collegiate fellow at the University of Iowa. She was, as of 2007, the director of clinical training in the Clinical Science Program.  Prior to her appointment at the University of Iowa, she was a professor of psychology at Southern Methodist University in Dallas, Texas. Her research focuses on personality and temperament, clinical and personality assessment, psychometrics, mood, anxiety, and depression.

Biography
Clark received her Bachelor of Arts degree in psycholinguistics from Cornell University in 1972, an MA in Asian studies from Cornell University with a specialization in Japan in 1977, and a Ph.D. in clinical psychology from the University of Minnesota in 1982.

She has served as president of the Society for a Science of Clinical Psychology (SSCP) as well as an executive board member of the Society for Research in Psychopathology (SRP) and the Association for Research in Personality. She is a member of the Personality and Personality Disorders Workgroup, the Disabilities and Impairments Assessment Study Group, and the Measurement Instruments Study Group for DSM-V.

She is the author of the Schedule for Nonadaptive and Adaptive Personality (SNAP), a personality questionnaire, recognized in psychiatry (not to be confused with SNAP-IV, Swanson, Nolan and Pelham Rating Scale, 4th edition).

She has published over 100 articles, books, and chapters, and is one of ISI's “HighlyCited” researchers. Clark has served as an editorial board member for such journals as the Journal of Abnormal Psychology, Journal of Personality Disorders, Journal of Research in Personality, and Journal of Personality Assessment.

To date, Clark's work has been cited over 100,000 times.

Selected papers

Most cited papers
Watson D, Clark LA, Tellegen A." Development And Validation Of Brief Measures Of Positive And Negative Affect - The Panas Scales" . Journal of Personality and Social Psychology 54 (6): 1063-1070 Jun 1988 
Watson D, Clark LA. "Negative Affectivity - The Disposition To Experience Aversive Emotional States". Psychological Bulletin 96 (3): 465-490 1984
Clark LA, Watson D. "Constructing validity: Basic issues in objective scale development".  "Psychological Assessment" 7 (3): 309-319
Clark LA, Watson D. "Tripartite Model Of Anxiety And Depression - Psychometric Evidence And Taxonomic Implications ". Journal of Abnormal Psychology 100 (3): 316-336 Aug 1991
Clark LA, Watson D, Mineka S. "Temperament, Personality, And The Mood And Anxiety Disorders". Journal of Abnormal Psychology 103 (1): 103-116 Feb 1994
Watson D, Clark LA, Carey G. "Positive And Negative Affectivity And Their Relation To Anxiety And Depressive-Disorders". Journal of Abnormal Psychology 97 (3): 346-353 Aug 1988

References

External links
Lee Anna Clark's faculty profile at the University of Notre Dame

American women psychologists
21st-century American psychologists
Cornell University alumni
University of Iowa faculty
University of Notre Dame faculty
University of Minnesota College of Liberal Arts alumni
Living people
Year of birth missing (living people)
American women academics
21st-century American women